This is a list of major acts and legislation which were signed by Philippine President Bongbong Marcos, including landmark bills which lapsed into law during his presidency. He has signed four laws in the 19th Congress, three of which are national in scope.

Republic Acts, Executive Orders (including the Implementing Rules and Regulations (IRRs)), Proclamations, Administrative Orders (& IRRs), Memorandum Circulars, and Memorandum Orders are all compiled and published by the Official Gazette.

Major acts and legislation

2022

2023

References

External link
 Official Gazette of the Republic of the Philippines

2020s in the Philippines
Law of the Philippines
Presidency of Bongbong Marcos